The Royal Australian and New Zealand College of Obstetricians and Gynaecologists (RANZCOG) is a not-for-profit organisation dedicated to the establishment of high standards of practice in obstetrics and gynaecology and women’s health. The College has a strong focus on women's health advocacy and trains and accredits doctors throughout Australia and New Zealand in the specialties of obstetrics and gynaecology. Its head office is in Melbourne, Australia.
It was founded in 1998, with the amalgamation of the Australian and New Zealand organisations. As of 2018, the College had 2,211 Fellows in Australia and New Zealand; 277 subspecialists, and 2,549 Diplomates.

There are six categories of membership:
 Fellows
 Subspecialists
 Diplomates
 Honorary Fellows – 37 honorary fellowships have been awarded
 Associate Members – Open to medical practitioners with specialist qualifications in obstetrics and gynaecology not awarded by RANZCOG
 Educational Affiliates – Open to medical practitioners in women's health who are not eligible for Associate Membership

The College is a non-government body, and is also independent of universities.

Fellowship Training Program
The RANZCOG training program is a six-year structured post-graduate program which leads to certification as a Fellow of RANZCOG (FRANZCOG). FRANZCOG status is the only post-graduate qualification which leads to recognition as a specialist obstetrician & gynaecologist in Australia and New Zealand.

The FRANZCOG specialist training program comprises the Core Training Program (first four years), and the Advanced Training Program (a further two years).

Fellows of the College work in the public and private health system, in hospitals and clinics; they teach and undertake research, in universities and in clinical settings; they work collaboratively with other healthcare organisations and government bodies to ensure that women and their families have access to quality care; and many Fellows do extensive pro bono work for the College and the community.

Certificate and Diploma Programs
The college offers training in Women’s Health for general practitioners at three levels:
 Certificate of Women’s Health
 Diploma of the RANZCOG (DRANZCOG) (formerly DipRACOG) training program
 Advanced Diploma of the RANZCOG (DRANZCOG Advanced)

Subspecialties
There are five subspecialties:
 Gynaecological oncology
 Maternal–fetal medicine
 Reproductive endocrinology and infertility
 Ultrasound
 Urogynaecology

References

External links
 RANZCOG website

Medical education in Australia
Specialist medical colleges in Australia
Medical education in New Zealand
Medical and health organisations based in Australia
Australian and New Zealand Obstetricians and Gynaecologists
Medical associations based in Australia
Organisations based in Australia with royal patronage
Medical associations based in New Zealand
Organisations based in New Zealand with royal patronage
1998 establishments in Australia